Jul i vårt hus is a studio album released on 17 November 2004, and is a Christmas album by Lasse Berghagen.

Track listing
Det är jul i vårt hus
Låt julens budskap nå vår jord (Let It Be Christmas)
Ser du stjärnan i det blå (When You Wish Upon a Star)
Juletid, julefrid
Nu tändas tusen juleljus
Snölyktan
Det är dags att tända alla ljusen (Have Yourself a Merry Little Christmas)
Jag vill inte va' din pepparkaksgubbe
Det är jul
Låt mig få tända ett ljus (Schlafe, mein Prinzchen, schlaf ein)
Då är du aldrig ensam
Juletid, välkommen hit (Leise rieselt der Schnee)
Jag drömmer om en jul hemma (White Christmas)
Stilla natt (Stille Nacht, heilige Nacht)

Contributors
Lasse Berghagen - Sång
Stockholm Session Strings - Musiker

Charts

Weekly charts

Year-end charts

Certifications

References 

Lasse Berghagen albums
2004 Christmas albums
Christmas albums by Swedish artists
Schlager Christmas albums